Magic Flute Diaries is a film loosely inspired by Mozart's classic opera, The Magic Flute. The film was released in 2008 by Sullivan Entertainment. Magic Flute Diaries won the award for Best Family Film in the 2008 Staten Island Film Festival.

Synopsis
Tom (Warren Christie), a young classical singer, reluctantly accepts the lead role in a production of The Magic Flute during Mozart's 250th birthday celebration in Salzburg at the urging of his girlfriend Sandy (Kelly Campbell). As rehearsals unfold, Tom is captivated by the magical power of Mozart's final opera. He is completely overcome with amazement at the musical genius that surrounds him. In an effort to visualize Mozart's fantasy, Tom imagines himself in the opera's story and drifts in and out of reality as if in a dream. Gradually he becomes completely enraptured by the intoxicating musical atmosphere swirling around him.

Tom's rapture is heightened further when he meets his mysterious co-star, Masha (Mireille Asselin), an unknown Russian soprano of astonishing talent. This extraordinary young singer is kept isolated from both the company and the press by her manager, Professor Nagel (Rutger Hauer). Tom becomes infatuated with Masha causing his relationship with Sandy to fall apart. Tom finds himself seduced as much by Mozart's music as by his bewitching co-star. Tom's concern for the girl, and his obsession to find out more about her mysterious past, becomes a quest that parallels the operatic fable actually being played out onstage.

Tom's strong feelings for Masha have left him unable to distinguish between reality and fantasy. Like his character in the opera, Tom wonders if he is being tested for a higher purpose but he knows he must play out his role in Masha's story until the final curtain.

Production

Origin
The concept for a film inspired by Mozart's The Magic Flute emerged from a number of sources. Director, writer and producer of the film, Kevin Sullivan, became interested in the city of Salzburg after his daughter travelled there with her school orchestra to attend Mozart's 250th birthday celebrations. Sullivan was also inspired by Andrew Lloyd Webber’s stage musical, The Woman in White, which used three-dimensional backdrops in its London production. Though Sullivan claims not to be an opera buff, he had always had a love for Mozart's The Magic Flute.

Filming
Due to the impossibility (budget and time constraints) of filming on-location in Salzburg, Sullivan and a team travelled to Austria, Germany and Hungary, taking digital photographs of various churches, streetscapes, grand interiors and scenic backdrops. Filmed in Toronto, shooting was completed in front of a green screen, allowing computer animators to remove the background and splice in digital photographs and images in postproduction. Thom Best served as DOP, with special effects by Tony Willis. Advanced mixers with live links to the live cameras allowed for the technicians to adjust background images in real time as the cameras rolled, giving a rough idea of what the finished product would look like.

Opera Atelier
The Toronto opera company, Opera Atelier, partnered with Sullivan Entertainment for the production, providing costumes, crew and cast. Opera Atelier co-artistic directors Marshall Pynkoski and Jeannette Zingg were choreographers for dance numbers in the film. Pynkoski also played the role of the opera director in the film.

Cast
 Rutger Hauer as Dr. Richard Nagel
 Warren Christie as Tom / Tamino
 Mireille Asselin as Masha / Pamina
 Kelly Campbell as Sandra / Papagena
 Olivier Laquerre as Papageno
 Curtis Sullivan as Sarastro
 Erin Windle as The Queen of the Night
 Daniel Kash as Monostatos
 Laura de Carteret as Ziggy

References

External links
 
 

2008 films
Canadian drama films
English-language Canadian films
Films based on The Magic Flute
Films directed by Kevin Sullivan
2008 drama films
2000s English-language films
2000s Canadian films